Mount Judson is a mountain on Vancouver Island, British Columbia, Canada, located  northeast of Gold River and  west of Crown Mountain.

See also 
 List of mountains in Canada

References 

Vancouver Island Ranges
One-thousanders of British Columbia
Nootka Land District